A fire command vehicle, also called a fire chief car, battalion chief vehicle, or fly car, is a vehicle used by a senior officer of a fire department to respond to firefighting incidents. Its markings typically indicate the rank of the senior officer.

In the 19th century, fire chief vehicles were horse-drawn, and known as a chief's buggy. With the advent and rise of the automobile, most fire departments retired their chief's buggies for automobiles with proper markings.In the United States, fire command vehicles are similar to police cars, and are equipped with emergency lighting and emergency vehicle equipment. Many fire departments use modified SUVs or pickup trucks as their command vehicles. 

In the United Kingdom, the fire car is usually unmarked and personally owned by a station manager. The car has emergency lighting and equipment installed.

See also
Fire engine
Nontransporting EMS vehicle
Glossary of firefighting

References

Fire service vehicles